State Route 252 (SR 252) is a  long north–south state highway in the northern portion of the U.S. state of Ohio. SR 252 has its northern terminus at a T-intersection with U.S. Route 6 (US 6) in the western Cleveland suburb of Bay Village.

Route description

Along its path, SR 252 travels through northern Medina County, the extreme eastern portion of Lorain County and the westernmost part of Cuyahoga County.  There are no stretches of SR 252 that are included as a part of the National Highway System.

History
SR 252 was assigned in 1925.  It was originally along its current alignment from its southern terminus at SR 18 and SR 57 northwest of Medina to its junction with SR 82, at the time known as SR 81, west of Strongsville.  One year later, the highway was extended north to its current northern terminus.

Major intersections

References

252
Transportation in Medina County, Ohio
Transportation in Lorain County, Ohio
Transportation in Cuyahoga County, Ohio